Mike Zagorski (born 15 June 1979 in Inverness, Scotland) is a Scottish road racing cyclist. Zagorski represented Scotland in the UK National Points Series (Mountain Bike racing) in 1996-1998.

Palmarès 

 2005 – Unattached
 1st Hawaii State Road Race Championship
 1st Hawaii State Criterium Championship
 1st Hawaii State Time Trial Championship
 1st Cycle to the Sun (hill climb) 10,000ft / 36 miles

 2006 – QuickRelease
 1st Hawaii State Criterium Championship
 1st Hawaii State Time Trial Championship
 1st Cycle to the Sun (hillclimb) 10,000ft / 36 miles
 1st Sea to Stars (hillclimb) 9130ft / 36 miles
 1st Hawaii Cycling Cup Overall General Classification
 1st Tantalus Time Trial  (hill climb)
 KoM Dick Evans Memorial Road Race
 7th Stage 2 - Mt Hood Cycling Classic

 2007 – QuickRelease
 1st Hawaii State Criterium Championship
 1st Hawaii State Time Trial Championship
 1st Aloha State Games Road Race
 1st Tantalus Time Trial (hill climb)
 KoM Dick Evans Memorial Road Race

 2008 – Pacific Velo - IT&B
 1st Hawaii State Time Trial Championship
 1st Castle To Hanauma Time Trial
 1st Makaha Time Trial
 1st Tantalus Time Trial

 starting 2009 to present – BME Racing Team
(For the results see the races below).

Records 
 2005 Hawaii State Time Trial  (Malaekahana) 54 min 9 s
 2006 Tantalus Time Trial (hill climb, Honolulu, HI, USA) 18 min 29 s
 2006 Sea to Stars (hill climb, Hilo to Mauna Kea, Big Island, HI, USA) 2 h 26 min 43 s
 2008 Hawaii State Time Trial (Malaekahana) 53 min 37 s (new record)

External links 
Mike Zagorski
USA Cycling
www.mikezagorski.com
Cycle To The Sun
Cycle to the Sun - Race course
BME Racing Team
Interview with the Honolulu Advertiser
Interview on Pez Cycling News
Interview on Pez Cycling News
Report on Cyclingnews.com

Cycle to the Sun - the longest 36 mile, steepest with the 10,004 feet of climbing, prestigious race from the sea level to the top of Maui's Haleakala Volcano Summit.

References 
 

Scottish male cyclists
1979 births
Living people
Sportspeople from Inverness